Throgmorton Street is a road in the City of London that runs between Lothbury in the west and Old Broad Street in the east. Throgmorton Avenue runs from the north side of Throgmorton Street to London Wall.

History
It is named after Nicholas Throckmorton, chief banker of England during the reign of Queen Elizabeth I and the head of an ancient Warwickshire family.

The London Stock Exchange occupied the southern side of Throgmorton Street from 1972 to 2004. It was also once the location of the Austin Friars home of Thomas Cromwell, King Henry VIII's chief minister.

Transport
The nearest London Underground station is Bank, which can be reached via Princes Street, a short distance to the south from Throgmorton Street's western end. The nearest mainline railway station is Liverpool Street.

Throgmorton Avenue
Throgmorton Avenue runs from Throgmorton Street to London Wall: it is a private road belonging to the Drapers' livery company and Carpenters' livery company with gates at each end; there is also pedestrian access from Copthall Avenue and Austin Friars. The gates to London Wall are controlled by the Carpenters' Company and are open between about 7 am and 7 pm on working weekdays. The livery halls of both companies can be accessed from the avenue, as can Drapers' Gardens; the Drapers occasionally use their hall's grander entrance on Throgmorton Street.

See also
 List of eponymous roads in London

References

External links 

Streets in the City of London